William Wynn (January 15, 1949 – June 4, 2013) was an American football defensive end who played for five seasons in the National Football League (NFL) for the Philadelphia Eagles from 1973–1976, and the Washington Redskins in 1977. He was drafted by the Eagles in the seventh round of the 1973 NFL Draft. He played college football at Tennessee State.

Will Wynn died at the age of 64 of heart failure at Einstein Medical Center in Philadelphia, Pennsylvania.

References

External links
 

1949 births
2013 deaths
American football defensive ends
Philadelphia Eagles players
Tennessee State Tigers football players
Washington Redskins players
People from Apex, North Carolina
Players of American football from North Carolina